Harsoinen teräs is the third and final album of Hassisen Kone, released in 1982. Musically, the album has a progressive twist to it. The songs are more complicated than on the group's two previous albums, and the band's lineup was expanded to seven people for this album, featuring a new guitarist Jukka Orma (who later continued with Ismo Alanko in Sielun Veljet), saxophonist Antti Seppo, keyboardist Safka Pekkonen and percussionist Hannu Porkka.

Track listing 
All songs by Alanko.
 "Harsoinen teräs"—4:40
 "Kupla kimaltaa"—3:30
 "Levottomat jalat"—3:04
 "Totuus"—5:35
 "Eksyneet lampaat"—2:37
 "Julkinen eläin"—3:50
 "Kuollut eläköön"—4:44
 "Olen toki, vain sen tiedän"—4:15
 "Pelko"—6:21

English edition
The track list of an English language edition (which has only vocal tracks redubbed) is slightly different, replacing some tracks with songs from previous releases.
 High Tension Wire (Harsoinen teräs) —04:51
 Gold Bricks (Muoviruusuja omenapuissa) —04:00
 Bubbles in the Stream (Kupla kimaltaa) —03:42
 Truth (Totuus) —05:33
 Blood Runs Slow (Hiljaa virtaa veri) —05:19
 Walking Fever (Levottomat jalat) —03:05
 Beast in the Window (Julkinen eläin) —03:52
 Panic (Pelko) —06:57

Personnel 
 Ismo Alanko -- vocals
 Jukka Orma -- guitar
 Jussi Kinnunen -- bass, backing vocals
 Safka Pekkonen -- organ, electric piano, piano, backing vocals
 Hannu Porkka -- xylophone, percussion
 Antti Seppo -- saxophone
 Harri Kinnunen -- drums

References 

1982 albums
Hassisen Kone albums